André Giovanini (born 8 July 1969) is a Brazilian equestrian. He competed in the team eventing at the 1996 Summer Olympics.

References

External links
 

1969 births
Living people
Brazilian male equestrians
Olympic equestrians of Brazil
Equestrians at the 1996 Summer Olympics
Equestrians at the 1995 Pan American Games
Pan American Games medalists in equestrian
Pan American Games gold medalists for Brazil
Pan American Games bronze medalists for Brazil
People from Limeira
Medalists at the 1995 Pan American Games
Sportspeople from São Paulo (state)
21st-century Brazilian people
20th-century Brazilian people